Lithocarpus bancanus is a tree in the beech family Fagaceae. The specific epithet  is from the Latin, meaning "of Bangka" (an island east of Sumatra).

Description
The yellowish to greyish brown bark is smooth to scaly.

Distribution and habitat
Lithocarpus bancanus grows naturally in Thailand, Borneo, Peninsular Malaysia and Sumatra. Its habitat is hill dipterocarp and sometimes peat swamp forests up to  altitude.

References

bancanus
Trees of Thailand
Trees of Borneo
Trees of Peninsular Malaysia
Trees of Sumatra
Plants described in 1870